The Netherlands national cricket team toured Kenya In December 1996 and played five limited overs matches against Kenyan teams. The touring Dutch team was captained by Tim de Leede.

Matches

References

1996 in Dutch cricket
1996 in Kenyan cricket
Kenya